Eagan is a city in Dakota County, Minnesota. It is south of Saint Paul and lies on the south bank of the Minnesota River, upstream from the confluence with the Mississippi River. Eagan and the other nearby suburbs form the southern section of the Minneapolis–Saint Paul area. Eagan's population was 68,855 at the 2020 census. The city was home to the headquarters of Northwest Airlines (now Delta Air Lines).

History
Eagan was named for Patrick Eagan, who was the first chairman of the town board of supervisors. He farmed a  parcel of land near the present-day town hall. Eagan (born 1811) and his wife Margaret Twohy (born 1816) emigrated from Tipperary, Ireland to Troy, New York, where they married in 1843. They arrived in Mendota circa 1853–54, before settling in the Eagan area.

Eagan was settled as an Irish farming community and "Onion Capital of the United States". Its largest growth took place after Highway 77 was relocated and expanded and a six-lane bridge (with three northbound and three southbound lanes) was constructed over the Minnesota River in 1980 and the final Interstate 35E freeway section southbound from Minnesota State Highway 110 in Mendota Heights to the area where it joins 35W in Burnsville was completed in the mid-1980s. Eagan's northern border is mostly along Interstate 494. Its southern border is about a mile south of Cliff Road. Its eastern border runs mostly along Minnesota State Highway 3. The western border runs mostly along the Minnesota River's south bank.

The city was visited by the "20th hijacker" of the September 11 attacks, Zacarias Moussaoui, before the attacks. Moussaoui attempted to complete flight training school, but was ultimately refused service by a local resident.

Geography

Interstate Highway 35E, Interstate Highway 494, Minnesota Highways 13, 55, 77, and 149 are six of Eagan's main routes.

The Eagan Core Greenway is an ongoing project to preserve Eagan's environmentally sensitive green space, with particular emphasis on Patrick Eagan Park and the two-mile (3 km) greenway connecting the park with Lebanon Hills Regional Park.

Demographics

2010 census
As of the census of 2010, there were 64,206 people, 25,249 households, and 16,884 families living in the city. The racial makeup of the city was 81.5% White, 5.6% African American, 0.3% Native American, 7.9% Asian, 1.7% from other races, and 3.0% from two or more races. Hispanic or Latino of any race were 4.5% of the population.

There were 25,249 households, of which 35.3% had children under the age of 18 living with them, 54.3% were married couples living together, 9.0% had a female householder with no husband present, 3.6% had a male householder with no wife present, and 33.1% were non-families. Of all households 25.9% were made up of individuals, and 5.6% had someone living alone who was 65 years of age or older. The average household size was 2.54 and the average family size was 3.10.

The median age in the city was 36.8 years. Of residents 25.5% were under the age of 18; 8.2% were between the ages of 18 and 24; 28.1% were from 25 to 44; 30.9% were from 45 to 64; and 7.6% were 65 years of age or older. The gender makeup of the city was 49.1% male and 50.9% female.

Economy

Eagan is home to legal publisher West, part of Thomson Reuters (7,350 employees), Blue Cross Blue Shield of Minnesota (3,900 employees), Scantron, and Coca-Cola's Midwest bottling facility (900 employees). The sparsely populated northern portions of the city, being convenient to freeways and MSP Airport, are also home to a number of warehouses and distribution centers, including Minnesota's largest UPS hub (1,400 employees).

Regional Elite Airline Services, Universal Cooperatives and Buffets, Inc. are also headquartered in Eagan.

Northwest Airlines had its headquarters in Eagan. After Northwest merged with Delta, the Northwest headquarters was disestablished. Todd Klingel, president of the Minneapolis Regional Chamber of Commerce, said that losing Northwest, a Fortune 500 company, would be "certainly a blow." He added, "But it's been expected for so long. Let's get on with it. The key is what can we do to minimize the loss to Minnesota." Mesaba Airlines employed around 1,830 people when it closed in 2011.

The Minnesota Vikings relocated their headquarters from Eden Prairie to Eagan, at the site of the former Northwest Airlines headquarters. The complex can be seen from Interstate 494. and is also home to the Twin Cities Orthopedics Performance Center, which serves as the Minnesota Vikings Training Facility. The facility is 277,000 square feet and includes an outdoor field that seats 6,500 fans. Fans can tour the facility or watch the daily activities on one of the six live action cameras around the stadium.

Top employers
According to Eagan's 2021 Comprehensive Annual Financial Report, its top employers were:

Government and politics

Eagan's municipal government is a Type B Statutory City, which provides for a council size of five members, one of whom is the mayor. Eagan's mayor since 2007 has been Mike Maguire.

The other councilmembers are:
 Paul Bakken (fifth non-consecutive term, 1997 and since 2007, seat up again in 2026)
 Gary Hansen (fourth term, since 2009 special election, seat up again in 2026)
 Cyndee Fields (fifth term, since 2001, seat up again in 2024)
 Mike Supina (first term, since 2021, seat up again in 2024)

In general, city government is nonpartisan. Candidates need not be (and usually are not) selected or endorsed by political parties, and no such endorsement appears on the ballot by state law. All five council seats including the mayor are elected at-large in a general election every four years. Terms are staggered with two council members elected one election cycle and the other two and the mayor two years later. The non-mayoral seats are elected in pairs, giving voters the chance to vote for up to two candidates. If necessary, races are narrowed down during a primary election.

As a part of Dakota County, Eagan's northern and western precincts join with regions northward to form the Third District on the County Commission. It has been represented by Laurie Halverson since 2021. The southern and eastern portions of the city are joined by regions south and east to form the Fourth District of the County Commission, which has been represented by William Droste since 2023. County commissioners serve four-year terms.

Eagan is in Minnesota's 2nd congressional district, represented by Angie Craig since 2019.

Since redistricting last took place, in 2022, Eagan straddles two Minnesota State Senate districts. Seventeen of Eagan's 18 precincts are joined with three precincts in neighboring Burnsville, four precincts in Mendota Heights, and the Village of Mendota to form Senate District 52, represented by Senator Jim Carlson (DFL). Eagan's southeasternmost precinct is part of Senate District 56, represented by Senator Erin Maye Quade (DFL).

In the Minnesota House of Representatives, each senate district is divided into an "A" and a "B" side. The western half of District 52 makes up House District 52A, represented by Liz Reyer (DFL). The eastern half of District 52 makes up House District 52B, represented by Ruth Richardson (DFL). John Huot (DFL) represents precinct 18 as part of House District 56B.

Eagan is home to Minnesota's 39th governor, Tim Pawlenty, who previously represented Eagan in the Minnesota House and on the city council. Former mayor Patricia Anderson served as the 17th state auditor from 2003 to 2007.

Recently two city questions have gone to the ballot for city residents to vote on. In 2008, the citizens voted 53% to 47% to allow private development of a defunct golf course instead of having the City purchase the land for public development or open space. In 2004 and in 2007, voters were presented with plans drafted by an established Charter Commission calling for the city to scrap its current governing structure as a statutory city and adopt a new home-rule city charter. The measure failed 80% to 20% in 2004 and 91% to 9% in 2007. The Charter Commission was dissolved on June 18, 2008.

Eagan lies in Minnesota's First Judicial District.

Education

Colleges and universities
 Rasmussen College

Primary and secondary schools

Public schools
Eagan is served by three school districts: Independent School District 191, Independent School District 196, and Independent School District 197. Some students choose to attend public schools in other school districts, as permitted under Minnesota's open enrollment statute.

High schools
 Eagan High School (196)

Middle schools
 Blackhawk Middle School (196)
 Dakota Hills Middle School (196)

Elementary schools
 Deerwood Elementary School (196)
 Glacier Hills Elementary School (196)
 Northview Elementary School (196)
 Oak Ridge Elementary School (196)
 Pilot Knob Elementary School (197)
 Pinewood Community School (196)
 Rahn Elementary School (191)
 Red Pine Elementary School (196)
 Sioux Trail Elementary School (191)
 Woodland Elementary School (196)

Private schools
 Faithful Shepherd Catholic School
 Trinity Lone Oak Lutheran School
 Trinity at River Ridge
 Denotes schools located outside of Eagan with attendance boundaries that cover part of the city.

Public libraries

The Dakota County Library operates the Wescott Library in Eagan. The library houses the headquarters of Dakota County Library.

Sports
The Minnesota Vikings built the Twin Cities Orthopedics Performance Center, a training facility for year-round use that opened in 2018. It features a stadium and six practice fields. The Vikings have announced a partnership with the Minnesota State High School League to host competitions at the venue.

The USL W League's Minnesota Aurora FC began play in 2022, with its home matches at Eagan's TCO Stadium.

Notable people
 Patricia Anderson, 17th Minnesota State Auditor and former mayor of Eagan
 Tim Commers, Minnesota state legislator and realtor
 Angie Craig, US representative for Minnesota's 2nd congressional district
 Natalie Darwitz, three time Olympic hockey player
 Nicholas David, American Soul singer and 3rd place finalist on NBC's The Voice
 Doron Jensen, founder of Timber Lodge Steakhouse
 Sona Mehring, businesswoman and the founder and CEO of the nonprofit 501(c)(3) organization CaringBridge
 Laura Osnes, singer and actress
 Mary Anderson Pawlenty, First Lady of Minnesota and Judge of the District Court of Minnesota 
 Tim Pawlenty, 39th Governor of Minnesota
 Lori Swanson, former Attorney General of Minnesota
 Mike Schneider, professional poker player
 Doug Wardlow, Minnesota state legislator
 Tim Vakoc, former associate pastor of St. John Neumann Catholic Church and first U.S. military chaplain to die from wounds received in the Iraq War
 Zach Zenner, NFL running back for the Detroit Lions

References

External links

 City of Eagan – Official site

 
Cities in Dakota County, Minnesota
Cities in Minnesota